Sobel is a surname. Notable people with the surname include:
 Adam Sobel (born 1967), American climatologist
 Alex Sobel (born 1975), British politician
 Barry Sobel (born 1959), American actor and comedian
 Bernard Sobel (1887–1964), American playwright, drama critic, and book writer
 Clifford Sobel (born 1949), United States diplomat and ambassador
 Curt Sobel (born 1953),  American composer and music editor
 Daniel Sobel (born 1975), British educational consultant
 Dava Sobel (born 1947), writer of popular expositions of scientific topics
 David Sobel, American education writer
 Eleanor Sobel (born 1946), representative in the Florida House of Representatives
 Helen Sobel Smith (1910-1969), American bridge player generally known as Helen Sobel
 Henry Sobel (1944–2019), Brazilian rabbi
 Herbert Sobel (1912–1987), United States Army officer during World War II
 Irwin Sobel (born 1940), American scientist, researcher in digital image processing
 Isador Sobel (1858–1939), American lawyer
 Janet Sobel (1894–1968), Ukrainian-American artist
 Joe Sobel (born 1945), American meteorologist
 Joel Sobel (born 1954), American economist
 John Sobel (born 1964), American tennis player
 Jordan Howard Sobel (1929-2010), Canadian-American philosopher 
 Michael E. Sobel, American statistician
 Milton Sobel (1919–2002), professor of statistics at the University of California, Santa Barbara, awarded a Guggenheim Fellowship in 1967
 Robert Sobel (1931–1999), professor of history at Hofstra University and a writer of business histories
 Szymon Sobel (born 2001), Polish rapper
 Ted Sobel (born 1953), American sportscaster and author

Fictional characters
Rosa Sobel, the protagonist in The Diary of the Rose  science fiction novelette by Ursula K. Le Guin

See also

 Sobell (disambiguation)
 Sobol (disambiguation)